Brian Lara Cricket is a cricket video game, the first in the Brian Lara Cricket series. It is endorsed by Brian Lara. Brian Lara Cricket was released on the PC in 1994 for DOS and Sega Mega Drive and Amiga in 1995 by Codemasters. The game was also rereleased in 1999 under the Codemaster Classics brand for Windows. It was developed by Audiogenic. The Mega Drive version spent 10 weeks at number 1 in the UK games charts during the summer of 1995. The game is a rebranded version of Graham Gooch World Class Cricket.

Gameplay
The game supports one to four players and has three modes of difficulty. It also features real player names such as Dion Nash, Michael Slater and Brian Lara (Brian Lara is the only player that endorses the game). The player can choose to play either a one-day game or a Test match and choose from all the major cricketing nations to play as or against. There are three main types of bowling in the game fast, spin and swing. Fielding can be manual or automatic.

Development
Brian Lara Cricket has pseudo-3D graphics which appears to make the perspective change when playing the game. The sound effects in the game are digitised. The game included the NVR save feature which allowed games to be stored using a battery to supply power to the memory inside the cartridge. It also claims to have hundreds of frames of animation for each sprite.

External links
 Codemasters official website

Cricket video games
1995 video games
1994 video games
Amiga games
DOS games
Sega Genesis games
Video games developed in the United Kingdom
Lara, Brian Cricket
Multiplayer and single-player video games
Windows games